Dorcadion cingulatum is a species of beetle in the family Cerambycidae. It was described by Ludwig Ganglbauer in 1884. It is known from Iran and Turkey.

See also 
Dorcadion

References

cingulatum
Beetles described in 1884